A National Interest Waiver is an exemption from the labor certification process and job offer requirement for advanced degree/exceptional ability workers applying for an EB-2  Visa for Immigration into the United States.

EB-2 petitioners can avoid the PERM Labor Certification process by presenting as a ‘national interest waiver’. NIW (National Interest Waiver) requires the foreign national to ‘self-petition’ so that he/she can file the I-140 form on his/her own behalf without involving any labor certification or a sponsoring employer.

The processing time for the NIW green cards usually varies from 3–9 months. This depends on the service center and the adjudicating officer assigned by the United States Citizenship and Immigration Services (USCIS) to each petition.

Physician National Interest Waiver (PNIW) 

Physician national interest waiver is a specially designed category for physicians/doctors to work and conduct impactful research in the United States. It enables a clinical physician/doctor to adjust his/her status to a permanent resident or to a green card holder without actually demonstrating that eligible and qualified physicians are unavailable in the particular location. The physician can also apply for the green card even if his/her employer is unwilling to file the petition on his/her behalf through the national interest waiver. In the United States, there always remains a shortage of physicians who can provide their healthcare services to the disadvantaged areas.

To apply for the PNIW category, eligible physicians must meet the set of requirements listed by the USCIS.

According to the regulations of USCIS, a physician may apply for the PNIW by working as a clinician in areas with shortage. The applicant need to work in one of the following areas to qualify:

Health Professional Shortage Areas (HPSA)
Medically Underserved Area (MUA)
Mental Health Professional Shortage Area (MHPSA)
Veterans’ Affairs (VA) facility

National Interest Waiver (Standard) 

NIW (National Interest Waiver) is an option to get a green card for certain individuals who have “exceptional abilities” in the field of science, arts, business or any other profession. This implies that the foreign national is eligible to apply for their green card without any job offer from a U.S. employer. The foreign national simply has to establish the fact that their research is beneficial to the United States and therefore determines the national interest. This provision applies to the employment-based immigration category, EB-2. The applicant has to qualify either for an “advanced degree professional” or an “alien of exceptional ability”. Sending evidence for qualifying both the categories does not guarantee success.

NIW petitions are common among Ph.D. scholars, researchers, postdoctoral research fellows and other advanced degree qualified professionals.

Matter of DHANASAR 

“USCIS may grant a national interest waiver if the petitioner demonstrates: (1) that the foreign national’s proposed endeavor has both substantial merit and national importance; (2) that he or she is well positioned to advance the proposed endeavor; and (3) that, on balance, it would be beneficial to the United States to waive the job offer and labor certification requirements.”

References

Visa policy of the United States